Aix-les-Bains or Aix-les-Bains-Le Revard is a railway station located in Aix-les-Bains, Savoie, south-eastern France. The station was opened in 1856 and is located on the Culoz–Modane railway and Aix-les-Bains–Annemasse railway. The train services are operated by SNCF.

Train services

The following services call at Aix-les-Bains-Le Revard as of 2022:
High speed services (TGV) Paris - Chambéry - Aix-les-Bains - Annecy
Regional services (TER Auvergne-Rhône-Alpes) Lyon - Ambérieu - Aix-les-Bains - Annecy
Regional services (TER Auvergne-Rhône-Alpes) Geneva - Bellegarde - Aix-les-Bains - Chambéry - Grenoble
Regional services (TER Auvergne-Rhône-Alpes) Annecy - Aix-les-Bains - Chambéry - Grenoble (- Valence)
Local services (TER Auvergne-Rhône-Alpes) (Lyon -) Ambérieu - Aix-les-Bains - Chambéry

References

Railway stations in Savoie
Railway stations in France opened in 1856